Syzygium australe, with many common names that include brush cherry, scrub cherry, creek lilly-pilly, creek satinash, and watergum, is a rainforest tree native to eastern Australia. It can attain a height of up to 35 m with a trunk diameter of 60 cm. In cultivation, this species is usually a small to medium-sized tree with a maximum height of only 18m.

Description 
The leaves are opposite, simple, lanceolate from 4–8 cm long. Flowers are white and in clusters. The pink, elongated, edible fruits range from a size of 1.5 to 2.3 centimeters long, and ripen mainly in summer and autumn. The fruit surrounds a small, circular seed. The flavour of the fruit is described as having a refreshing taste, and have a small hint of sourness to them.

This species is commonly confused with magenta cherry and the blue lilly pilly. However, the brush cherry has a paler trunk.

Distribution
The species occurs in coastal regions in Queensland and New South Wales, northwards from Batemans Bay.

Germination 
Syzygium australe usually takes about 6 weeks to germinate depending on the temperature and the soil moisture. Ideal temperatures for Brush cherry germination is 18-26 degrees Celsius (65-80 F). The soil needs to be moist, but not waterlogged as this can rot the seed. For successful germination, remove all the flesh from the seed. Plant the seeds about half an inch deep in soil. If planting in a pot, make sure it has good drainage.

Cultivation and Uses 
Brush cherry is commonly cultivated in gardens in Eastern Australia, mostly as shorter, shrub-like cultivars such as "Aussie Boomer", "Aussie Compact", "Birdsville", "Bush Christmas", "Minipilly" and "Tiny Trev". These are especially popular as hedges.

The pleasantly sour fruit are also eaten fresh or cooked. The fruit can be used to make jams and jellies.

This species has been adopted by Coffs Harbour City Council as the City's floral emblem.

Brush cherry is used as a subject for bonsai.

See also
Austromyrtus dulcis
Eugenia buxifolia
Solanum aviculare
Smilax glyciphylla

References

External links
 
 
 
 

australe
Bushfood
Trees of Australia
Ornamental trees
Myrtales of Australia
Flora of New South Wales
Flora of Queensland
Taxa named by Bernard Hyland